Snorre Strand Nilsen (born 14 January 1997) is a Norwegian football defender who plays as a right back for Kristiansund BK.

He is a son of Harald Christian Strand Nilsen and hails from Gjøvik. He started his career in Gjøvik-Lyn at the age of 5, moving on to Raufoss after the 2012 season and to the English club Portsmouth's academy in the summer of 2013.

He returned to Norway in the summer of 2016 and the senior team of Gjøvik-Lyn. From 2017 to 2020 he played for Raufoss again, helping them cement a spot in the 1. divisjon, before he was signed by Kristiansund BK ahead of the 2021 season. He made his Eliteserien debut in May 2021 against Molde. One week later, he scored his first Eliteserien goal against Vålerenga.

References

1997 births
Living people
Sportspeople from Gjøvik
Norwegian footballers
Raufoss IL players
Kristiansund BK players
Norwegian First Division players
Eliteserien players
Association football defenders
Norwegian expatriate footballers
Expatriate footballers in England
Norwegian expatriate sportspeople in England